Heptobarbital (Rutonal), also known as phenylmethylbarbituric acid is a barbiturate derivative. It has often been confused with methylphenobarbital because both drugs contain a methylphenyl moiety and are overall very similar in structure.

See also 
 Barbiturate

References 

Barbiturates
GABAA receptor positive allosteric modulators